Plocaederus is a genus of beetles in the family Cerambycidae, containing the following species:

 Plocaederus barauna Martins & Monné, 2002
 Plocaederus bipartitus (Buquet, 1860)
 Plocaederus confusus Martins & Monné, 2002
 Plocaederus dozieri Martins & Galileo, 2010
 Plocaederus fasciatus (Martins & Monné, 1975)
 Plocaederus fragosoi Martins & Monné, 2002
 Plocaederus fraterculus (Martins, 1979)
 Plocaederus glaberrimus (Martins, 1979)
 Plocaederus glabricollis (Bates, 1870)
 Plocaederus inconstans (Gounelle, 1913)
 Plocaederus mirim Martins & Monné, 2002
 Plocaederus pactor (Lameere, 1885)
 Plocaederus pisinnus (Martins & Monné, 1975)
 Plocaederus plicatus (Olivier, 1790)
 Plocaederus rugosus (Olivier, 1795)
 Plocaederus rusticus (Gounelle, 1909)
 Plocaederus yucatecus (Chemsak & Noguera, 1997)

References

 
Cerambycini